The lesser eyed sallow (Enargia infumata) is a moth of the family Noctuidae. It is found from Alaska and New Brunswick to Ontario, south to Connecticut in eastern North America. In western North America it is found from Saskatchewan and Alberta, south to Utah and California.

Adults are on wing from June to September. There is one generation per year.

The larvae feed on the leaves of Populus species and perhaps other willow and birch species.

References

External links
Bug Guide

Caradrinini
Moths of North America
Moths described in 1874